Duygu is a female Turkish name. It is also a common word used as a noun, adjective or verb in everyday but also written language. For example, ‚duygusal olmak‘ translates into ‚to be sensitive‘. ‚Duygulanmak‘ translates into ‚to be touched by sb./sth.‘. Etymologically the name derives from the verb ‚duymak‘, ie ‚to hear‘. As a variant of both forms, ‘duyu’ means ‘sense’ in terms of an emotional state.

People
 Duygu Asena (1946-2006), Turkish journalist
 Duygu Aynacı (born 1996), Turkish weightlifter
 Duygu Bal (born 1987), Turkish volleyball player
 Duygu Çete (born 1989), Turkish Paralympic judoka
 Duygu Doğan (born 2000), Turkish rhythmic gymnast
 Duygu Fırat (born 1990), Turkish basketball player
 Duygu Sakallı (born 1991), Turkish handball player
 Duygu Ulusoy (born 1987), Turkish alpine skier 
 Duygu Yılmaz (born 1988), Turkish footballer

Turkish unisex given names